The Return of Raffles is a 1932 British crime film directed by Mansfield Markham and starring George Barraud, Camilla Horn and Claud Allister. It is based on the A.J. Raffles stories by EW Hornung and inspired by the success of the 1930 American film Raffles, to which it serves as a loose sequel. It was shot at the Walton Studios west of London.

Cast
 George Barraud as A.J. Raffles
 Camilla Horn as Elga
 Claud Allister as Bunny
 A. Bromley Davenport as Sir John Truwode
 Sydney Fairbrother as Lady Truwode
 Harold Saxon-Snell as Von Spechen

References

Bibliography
Low, Rachael. Filmmaking in 1930s Britain. George Allen & Unwin, 1985.
Wood, Linda. British Films, 1927–1939. British Film Institute, 1986.

External links

1932 films
1932 crime drama films
British crime drama films
British black-and-white films
Works based on A. J. Raffles
Films set in England
Films shot at Nettlefold Studios
1930s English-language films
1930s British films